The Greatest is a 2011 compilation album by American singer Diana Ross and includes both her solo and Supremes material as well as duets with Lionel Richie, Rod Stewart, Michael Jackson, Ray Charles and Marvin Gaye. The album reached number 24 in the UK and was awarded a BPI Silver disc for sales of over 60,000 copies in 2015.

Track listing

Disc 1 
 "I'm Coming Out"
 "Muscles"
 "Ain't No Mountain High Enough"
 "Why Do Fools Fall in Love"
 "If We Hold on Together"
 "Love Child" – Diana Ross & The Supremes
 "Remember Me"
 "When You Tell Me That You Love Me"
 "Chain Reaction"
 "Touch Me in the Morning"
 "It's My House"
 "The Boss"
 "Last Time I Saw Him"
 "My Old Piano"
 "Love Hangover"
 "Work That Body"
 "Endless Love" – Lionel Richie, Diana Ross
 "Baby Love"  – The Supremes
 "Ease on Down the Road" #1 – Diana Ross, Michael Jackson, Quincy Jones
 "Stop, Look, Listen (To Your Heart)" – Diana Ross, Marvin Gaye
 "Come See About Me" – The Supremes
 "Reach Out and Touch (Somebody's Hand)"

Disc 2 
 "Upside Down"
 "Stop! In the Name of Love" – The Supremes
 "I'm Still Waiting"
 "Surrender"
 "One Shining Moment"
 "Theme from Mahogany (Do You Know Where You're Going To)"
 "Reflections" – Diana Ross & The Supremes
 "No One Gets the Prize"
 "You Are Everything" – Diana Ross, Marvin Gaye
 "The Happening" – The Supremes
 "I'm Gonna Make You Love Me" – Diana Ross & The Supremes, The Temptations
 "You Can't Hurry Love" – The Supremes
 "It's My Turn"
 "Big Bad Love" – Diana Ross, Ray Charles
 "DoobeDood'nDoobe, DoobeDood'nDoobe, DoobeDood'nDoo"
 "Where Did Our Love Go" – The Supremes
 "Not Over You Yet"
 "Take Me Higher"
 "You Keep Me Hangin' On" – The Supremes
 "I've Got a Crush on You" – Diana Ross, Rod Stewart
 "Lovin', Livin' and Givin'"
 "What a Wonderful World" [Live from Wembley Arena, 1989]

Charts

Certifications

References 

2011 compilation albums
Diana Ross compilation albums